Rosie is a Canadian comedy-drama film, directed by Gail Maurice and released in 2022. Maurice's feature directorial debut and an expansion of her 2018 short film of the same name, the film centres on Rosie (Keris Hope Hill), a young First Nations girl who is sent to live with her aunt Frédérique (Melanie Bray) in Montreal after her mother's death, and learns the value of rebuilding chosen family from Fred and her two-spirit friends Flo (Constant Bernard) and Mo (Alex Trahan).

The cast also includes Josée Young, Brandon Oakes, Jocelyne Zucco, Arlen Aguayo-Stewart, Jean Pearson, Tony De Santis, Xavier Yuvens, Pierre Simpson, Ron Lea, Domenico Fiore, Joseph Claude Dubois, Mike Ross, Matt Raffy and David Thompson.

The film was shot in Hamilton, Ontario, in 2021.

It premiered in the Discovery program at the 2022 Toronto International Film Festival on September 9, 2022. It was subsequently selected as the closing film of the 2022 imagineNATIVE Film and Media Arts Festival.

Critical response
Courtney Small of That Shelf wrote that "while the film has several important things to say, its overly sweet packaging takes away some of the overall impact of its commentary. Despite not delivering the knockout punch one hopes for, there is still enough here to maintain one’s interest in the both the film and whatever Maurice creates next. ROSIE reminds us that one can find community in the direst of situations, sometimes you just need to choose who that family will be."

The film was named to TIFF's annual year-end Canada's Top Ten list for 2022.

Awards
The film was shortlisted for the Directors Guild of Canada's 2022 Jean-Marc Vallée DGC Discovery Award.

It won the award for Best Canadian Feature Film at the 2022 Festival international du cinéma francophone en Acadie.

References

External links
 

2022 films
2022 comedy-drama films
2022 LGBT-related films
Canadian comedy-drama films
Canadian LGBT-related films
LGBT-related comedy-drama films
First Nations films
2022 directorial debut films
LGBT First Nations culture
Drag (clothing)-related films
Features based on short films
2020s Canadian films
Films set in Montreal
Films set in 1984